On January 1, 1953, the New Jersey Highway Department renumbered many of the State Routes. This renumbering was first proposed in 1951 in order to reduce confusion to motorists. A few rules were followed in deciding what to renumber:
No state route and U.S. Route could have the same number; this eliminated 1 (which was also eliminated by other criteria), 22, 30, 40 and 46. While Route 1 was broken into several pieces, the other four were renumbered as Routes 59, 69, 70 and 77, respectively. Route 69 later became Route 31 after frequent theft of road signs due to the sexual connotation of the number.
Concurrencies were highly discouraged; this included U.S. Routes and meant that U.S. Route numbers would now be referred to directly by NJDOT.
No State Route could have a lettered prefix or suffix.
A State Route that ended at a state border was renumbered to match the number assigned by the adjacent state.
The New Jersey Turnpike, Garden State Parkway, and Palisades Interstate Parkway were not to have route numbers.

New numbers assigned semi-arbitrarily included 15 and 20 (13-20 were not assigned in the 1927 renumbering), the sequence from 57 to 93, and 152 to 165 for minor routes (continuing from pre-renumbering 151).

In the table, S routes (like S1 and S1A) is shown with the S after the number (like 1S and 1SA) for sorting reasons.

See also

1927 New Jersey State Route renumbering

References

 renumbering 1953
New Jersey State Highway Renumbering, 1953
New Jersey State Highway Renumbering, 1953
Highway renumbering in the United States